René Basset (24July 18554January 1924) was a French orientalist, specialist of the Berber language and the Arabic language.

Biography 
René Basset was the first director of the "École des lettres d'Alger" created in 1879 during the French colonisation of Algeria.

A member of the société Asiatique of Paris as well as those of Leipzig and Florence, he collaborated with the Journal Asiatique and studied Chinese Islam.

André Basset and Henri Basset were his sons.

Publications 
Étude  sur la zenatia du Mzab    Notes de lexicographie berbère, 1887.  sur le site Archive La Religion des Berbères de l’antiquité jusqu’à l'islam, Les Belles Lettres     Prières des musulmans chinois, Éditions , 1878Les Manuscrits arabes de la Zaouia d'El Hamel, Etablissement typographique Florentin, 1897Recherches sur la religion des Berbères, 1910.
Son anthologie Mille et un contes, récits et légendes arabes a été rééditée sous la direction de , chez José Corti, Collection Merveilleux n° 29, 2005, 2 tomes, 504 et 702 p. (édition originale parue en 1924 chez Maisonneuve frères). 

 Honours 
Commandeur of the Légion d'honneur
Officiere of the Ordre des Palmes Académiques
Grand-officier of the Nichan Iftikhar
Commandeur of the Order of Menelik II
Chevalier of the Order of St. Sylvester

 References 

 Bibliography 
 .
 Guy Basset, « Basset, René (1855-1924) », in L'Algérie et la France'',  (p. 96–97)

1855 births
People from Lunéville
1924 deaths
French orientalists
Linguists from France
Knights of the Order of St. Sylvester
French Arabists
Commandeurs of the Légion d'honneur
Berberologists
Recipients of orders, decorations, and medals of Ethiopia